Al-Haj Nawab Ghulam Muhammad Khan Bahadur (11 July 1763 – 1828) was briefly Nawab of Rampur from 1793 to 1794. The younger son of Faizullah Khan, Ghulam Muhammad became Nawab in 1793 after deposing his elder brother, Muhammad Ali Khan Bahadur. His reign quickly took on a tyrannical aspect, and he was soon deemed a danger to the region's stability. Thus, in 1794, he was himself deposed by troops of the East India Company and of the Nawab of Awadh, being succeeded as Nawab by his nephew, Ahmad Ali Khan Bahadur. Ghulam Muhammad then undertook the Hajj, after which he fled to Mysore and Tipu Sultan, later settling in the Punjab. He died at Nadaun in 1828.

Cultural Depictions

References

People from Himachal Pradesh
Nawabs of India
Mughal Empire
Nawabs of Rampur
Indian Shia Muslims
1763 births
1828 deaths